The 1991 Fordham Rams football team was an American football team that represented Fordham University during the 1991 NCAA Division I-AA football season. For the second straight year, Fordham finished last in the Patriot League. 

In their sixth year under head coach Larry Glueck, the Rams compiled a 2–8 record. Mark Blazejewski and Gary Brennan were the team captains.

The Rams were outscored 242 to 149. Their winless (0–5) conference record placed last in the six-team Patriot League standings. 

Fordham played its home games at Jack Coffey Field on the university's Rose Hill campus in The Bronx, in New York City.

Schedule

References

Fordham
Fordham Rams football seasons
Fordham Rams football